Typhoon Kitty was a typhoon that brought heavy damages to Kantō region, Japan in 1949.

Meteorological history 
Kitty originated from an easterly wave that passed Kwajalein and intensified near 23 N and 15.4 E It is believed that intensification was the result of a westerly trough that moved to the. north of the storm prior to its detection. Further, the northwest movement into the nose of the Pacific high cell assisted in maintaining the gradient. Kitty began recurvature near 32 N and 140 E, but was never completed as the storm maintained a northerly movement across Honshu and dissipated near Hokkaido. Reconnaissance reported a maximum wind of 65 knots. Kitty inflicted more damage on the Tokyo area than any storm during the 1949 season. Gusts to 75 knots were reported along with torrential rains.

References

See also 
 Typhoon Kathleen - hit East Japan in 1947
 Typhoon Ione - hit East Japan in 1948

Typhoons in Japan
1949 in Japan
August 1949 events in Asia
September 1949 events